Flowers of the Motherland is a 1955 Chinese black-and-white film, which was produced by Changchun Film Group Corporation. Being the first movie aimed to children after the creation of the People's Republic, the movie follows the primary school students' life after China's founding. It portrayed colorful clothing aimed to inspire viewers with hope.

Story 
In Beijing's Beijing Primary School, a fictional school, Class One Grade Five (五年级甲班) has more than 40 students. These students are cute, clever and have become Chinese Young Pioneers; except two students: Jiang Lin (江林), who is mischievous and not hard-working, and Yang Yongli (杨永丽), who is arrogant, anti-social and doesn't care about others.

On June 1, students get together with the home-bound People's Volunteer Army in Zhongshan Park. Volunteer Yang Zhiping (杨志平) notices that two students don't wear Red scarfs, which symbolize the Young Pioneers of the Chinese Communist Party. Before he leaves, he encourages the students to study hard, help each other, and try to become a model class. Student Liang Huiming (梁慧明) is touched by his words and tries to help the two, but they do not appreciate it. This make Liang feel sad. Classmates sympathize with Liang and lose faith in the two.

The head teacher Feng encourages students to have patience. Later, classmates invite Jiang Lin to do an oxygen experiment, to make him interested in studying. While Yang Yongli's foot is scalded, they helped her make up homework, so that she can take  exams with the class. In classmates helping, Yang and Jiang were moved, they progress together in summer vacation.

After summer vacation, the class became to grade six. Jiang Lin and Yang Yongli become Young Pioneers for their progress.

Cast 

 Zhang Yunying (张筠英) - Yang Yongli (杨永丽)
 Li Xixiang (李锡祥) － Jiang Lin (江林)
 Zhao Weiqing (赵维勤) － Liang Huiming (梁慧明)
 Guo Yuntai (郭允泰) － Yang Zhiping (杨志平)
 Shi Ling (石灵) － Yang Yongli's mother
 Lü Dayu (吕大渝) - Liu Jü (刘菊)

In literature 
While being tortured by a Beijing agent in the novel Performance Anomalies, the spy hero Cono 7Q, partly of Chinese origin, sings the lyrics to the song "Let Us Sway Twin Oars Together" [讓我們蕩起雙槳] by Qiao Yu from the well-known 1950s Chinese propaganda film "Flowers of the Motherland" [also translated as "Bud of the Motherland"]. His torturers' recognition of the song causes them to hesitate, saving Cono 7Q's life.

Legacy 
 Due to the movie's depiction of children's lives, Chinese people usually use the movie title "Flowers of the Motherland" to praise children.
 The interlude song "Let us Sway Twin Oars" (讓我們蕩起雙槳) was included in China's primary school music textbook, and became a famous children's song.

References

External links

1955 films
Chinese children's films
Chinese black-and-white films
Chinese drama films
1955 drama films